The 2015 Mutua Madrid Open was a professional tennis tournament that was played on outdoor clay courts at the Park Manzanares in Madrid, Spain from 2–10 May. It was the 14th edition of the event on the ATP World Tour and 7th on the WTA Tour. It was classified as an ATP World Tour Masters 1000 event on the 2015 ATP World Tour and a Premier Mandatory event on the 2015 WTA Tour.

Ion Țiriac the former Romanian ATP player and now billionaire businessman is the current owner of the tournament.

Points and prize money

Point distribution

Prize money

ATP singles main-draw entrants

Seeds

Rankings are as of 27 April 2015.

Other entrants
The following players received wildcards into the main draw:
  Nicolás Almagro
  Pablo Andújar
  Marius Copil
  Marcel Granollers

The following players received entry from the qualifying draw:
  Thomaz Bellucci
  Alejandro Falla
  Daniel Gimeno Traver
  Alejandro González
  Thanasi Kokkinakis
  Albert Ramos Viñolas
  Luca Vanni

The following player received entry as a lucky loser:
  João Sousa

Withdrawals
Before the tournament
  Julien Benneteau → replaced by  Simone Bolelli
  Novak Djokovic → replaced by  Jiří Veselý
  Tommy Robredo → replaced by  João Sousa
  Andreas Seppi → replaced by  Juan Mónaco
  Gilles Simon → replaced by  Jerzy Janowicz

Retirements
  Martin Kližan
  Donald Young

ATP doubles main-draw entrants

Seeds

Rankings are as of 27 April 2015.

Other entrants
The following pairs received wildcards into the doubles main draw:
  Mahesh Bhupathi /  Nick Kyrgios
  Feliciano López /  Max Mirnyi

The following pair received entry as alternates:
  Steve Johnson /  Sam Querrey

Withdrawals
Before the tournament
  John Isner (back injury)

Retirements
  Vasek Pospisil (ankle injury)

WTA singles main-draw entrants

Seeds

Rankings are as of 27 April 2015.

Other entrants
The following players received wildcards into the main draw:
  Lara Arruabarrena
  Alexandra Dulgheru
  Francesca Schiavone
  Sílvia Soler Espinosa
  María Teresa Torró Flor

The following player received entry using a protected ranking into the main draw:
  Bethanie Mattek-Sands

The following players received entry from the qualifying draw:
  Paula Badosa Gibert
  Mariana Duque Mariño
  Marina Erakovic
  Julia Görges
  Olga Govortsova
  Mirjana Lučić-Baroni
  Christina McHale
  Andreea Mitu

Withdrawals
Before the tournament
  Jelena Janković → replaced by  Bethanie Mattek-Sands
  Johanna Larsson → replaced by  Ajla Tomljanović
  Magdaléna Rybáriková → replaced by  Kurumi Nara

During the tournament
  Andrea Petkovic (gastrointestinal illness)

Retirements
  Paula Badosa Gibert (left leg injury)
  Alexandra Dulgheru (cramping)

WTA doubles main-draw entrants

Seeds

Rankings are as of 27 April 2015.

Other entrants
The following pairs received wildcards into the doubles main draw:
  Paula Badosa Gibert /  Sara Sorribes Tormo
  Alizé Cornet /  Heather Watson
  Vera Dushevina /  María José Martínez Sánchez
  Madison Keys /  Lisa Raymond

The following pair received entry as alternates:
  Lara Arruabarrena /  Irina-Camelia Begu

Withdrawals
Before the tournament
  Paula Badosa Gibert (left leg injury)

Finals

Men's singles

  Andy Murray defeated  Rafael Nadal, 6–3, 6–2

Women's singles

  Petra Kvitová defeated  Svetlana Kuznetsova, 6–1, 6–2

Men's doubles

  Rohan Bopanna /  Florin Mergea defeated  Marcin Matkowski /  Nenad Zimonjić, 6–2, 6–7(5–7), [11–9]

Women's doubles

  Casey Dellacqua /  Yaroslava Shvedova defeated  Garbiñe Muguruza /  Carla Suárez Navarro, 6–3, 6–7(4–7), [10–5]

References

External links
 Official website